Anakana Schofield (born 1971) is an Irish-Canadian author, who won the 2012 Amazon.ca First Novel Award and the Debut-Litzer Prize for Fiction in 2013 for her debut novel Malarky. Born in England to an Irish mother, she lived in London and in Dublin, Ireland until moving to Vancouver, British Columbia in 1999. The novel was also a shortlisted nominee for the Ethel Wilson Fiction Prize.

Martin John, her second novel, was published in 2015. The novel was shortlisted for the 2015 Scotiabank Giller Prize, the 2016 Ethel Wilson Fiction Prize, the 2016 Goldsmiths Prize, and the 2017 ReLit Award for fiction. 
Schofield has also been a literary critic, essayist and broadcaster, contributing to the London Review of Books Blog, The Globe and Mail, CBC Radio, The Guardian, The Irish Times and the Vancouver Sun.

Her third novel, Bina: A Novel in Warnings, centred on Our Woman's best friend from her first book Malarky, was published in 2019 in Canada and 2020 in UK. Bina was shortlisted for the 2020 Goldsmiths Prize. The jury described the novel as "Startlingly original and horribly funny, Anakana Schofield's Bina is that rare thing: a black comedy about euthanasia. Composed as a series of warnings scribbled on the backs of envelopes from the safety of her bed, the narrator is a septuagenarian who has had enough. And we can see why: her front garden is filled with political activists, her back garden with medical waste; her lodger stayed on for an extra ten years and she is suspected of murdering her best friend. In all her despair, and empathy for the despair of others, Bina emerges from her elliptical missives, addressed to everyone but no-one in particular, as an eccentric heroine of monumental moral courage." The novel will be published in February, 2021 in the US by the New York Review of Books.

Works
Malarky (2012)
Rereading the Riot Act And On (2013)
Martin John (2015)
Bina: A Novel in Warnings (2019)
 excerpt: Bina. Granta #141, autumn 2017, pp. 143–148

References

External links

Canadian women novelists
Writers from Vancouver
1971 births
Living people
Irish emigrants to Canada
21st-century Canadian novelists
21st-century Canadian women writers
Irish women novelists
21st-century Irish novelists
21st-century Irish women writers
Amazon.ca First Novel Award winners